Joseph Gerald Lancaster (born 28 April 1926) is an English former footballer who played as a goalkeeper. He played for Manchester United and Accrington Stanley in The Football League in the late 1940s and early 1950s. He was born in Stockport. In November 2016, he was noted as being Manchester United's oldest living player.

References

External links
MUFCinfo profile

1926 births
Living people
Accrington Stanley F.C. (1891) players
Association football goalkeepers
English footballers
Footballers from Stockport
Manchester United F.C. players